Josh Silver (born November 14, 1962) is an American musician who is the former keyboardist, producer and backing vocalist of gothic metal band Type O Negative. He joined the band at frontman Peter Steele's request. He played for Type O Negative until they disbanded due to Steele's death in 2010.

Silver, who is Jewish, was also a founding member of the short-lived rock group Fallout along with Steele. Fallout gave birth to Carnivore which ultimately led to Type O Negative.  After the breakup of Fallout, Silver formed hard rock band Original Sin.

Silver was first introduced to professional recording and production upon meeting and working with producer and Soundscape Recording Studio owner Richard Termini. Fallout's earliest recordings trace back to the Termini Soundscape sessions from the late 1970s.

After the death of Type O Negative frontman Peter Steele, Silver became a certified EMT and then paramedic in New York, as stated by Silver, for over a year this had been his "plan B" to support his wife and children. Assuming at the time that the band was finished, Silver had begun EMT schooling during Steele's 2008 hiatus. He still holds his Paramedic position with the New York City Fire Department.

Discography

Fallout 

 Untitled 7" single (1981)

Type O Negative 
 Slow, Deep and Hard (1991)
The Origin of the Feces (1992)
Bloody Kisses (1993)
 October Rust  (1996)
 World Coming Down (1999)
 Life Is Killing Me (2003)
 Dead Again (2007)

Guest appearances 

 Roadrunner United (2005) – Roads & Enemy of the State

Albums produced 

 Life of Agony – River Runs Red (1993)
 Pist.On – Number One (1996)

Type O Negative 

 The Origin of the Feces (1992)
Bloody Kisses (1993)
 October Rust  (1996)
 World Coming Down (1999)
 Life Is Killing Me (2003)
 Dead Again (2007)

References

External links 

1962 births
American heavy metal keyboardists
Living people
Jewish American musicians
Musicians from Brooklyn
Type O Negative members
Jewish heavy metal musicians
21st-century American Jews
Emergency medical technicians